Safané is a department or commune of Mouhoun Province in western Burkina Faso. Its capital lies at the town of Safané. According to the 1996 census the department has a total population of 44,925.

Towns and villages
 Safané	(7 502 inhabitants) (capital)
 Banga	(374 inhabitants)
 Banou	(1 184 inhabitants)
 Bara	(1 402 inhabitants)
 Bara-Yankasso	(946 inhabitants)
 Biforo	(1 768 inhabitants)
 Bilakongo	(691 inhabitants)
 Bomboila	(1 264 inhabitants)
 Bominasso	(340 inhabitants)
 Bona	(1 143 inhabitants)
 Bossien	(667 inhabitants)
 Datomo	(4 141 inhabitants)
 Doumakélé	(304 inhabitants)
 Guizigoron	(104 inhabitants)
 Kienséré	(972 inhabitants)
 Kira	(705 inhabitants)
 Kokoun	(1 209 inhabitants)
 Kongoba	(1 247 inhabitants)
 Kongosso	(354 inhabitants)
 Kongodiana	(401 inhabitants)
 lanfièra	(1 109 inhabitants)
 Makongo	(1 642 inhabitants)
 missakongo	(281 inhabitants)
 Nounou	(1 968 inhabitants)
 Pakolé	(405 inhabitants)
 Pakoro	(170 inhabitants)
 Sikorosso	(15 inhabitants)
 Sirakorosso	(190 inhabitants)
 Siralo	(1 234 inhabitants)
 Sin	(1 191 inhabitants)
 Sodien	(1 269 inhabitants)
 Sokoula	(600 inhabitants)
 Sokoulani	(658 inhabitants)
 Tiekuy	(937 inhabitants)
 Tounou	(1 066 inhabitants)
 Tuena	(735 inhabitants)
 Yamou	(627 inhabitants)
 Yankasso	(2 012 inhabitants)
 Ziasso	(899 inhabitants)
 Zienkuy	(1 199 inhabitants)

References

Departments of Burkina Faso
Mouhoun Province